Saidu Bah Kamara (born 3 March 2002) is a Sierra Leonean professional footballer who plays as a Defensive Midfielder for the Sierra Leone National Premier League side Bo Rangers FC, and Sierra Leone national team.

References 

2002 births
Sportspeople from Freetown
Living people
Sierra Leonean footballers
Sierra Leone international footballers
Bo Rangers F.C. players
2021 Africa Cup of Nations players